Tylolaelaps is a genus of mites in the family Laelapidae.

Species
 Tylolaelaps rhizomydis Y. M. Gu & C. S. Wang, 1979

References

Laelapidae